was a Japanese football player and manager. He managed Japan national team.

Coaching career
Sasaki was born in Fukushima Prefecture in 1891. After graduating from Tokyo Higher Normal School, in May 1921, he became manager for Japan national team for 1921 Far Eastern Championship Games in Shanghai. He managed 2 matches at this competition, but Japan lost in both matches (1-3, v Philippines and 0-4, v Republic of China). These matches are not counted as International A Match because Japan Football Association was not founded.

After retirement
After retirement, Sasaki became professor and he taught at Utsunomiya University, Fukushima University, Chukyo University and Japan Women's College of Physical Education and so on.

On July 23, 1982, Sasaki died of lung thrombus in Suginami, Tokyo at the age of 91.

References

1891 births
1982 deaths
University of Tsukuba alumni
Association football people from Fukushima Prefecture
Japanese footballers
Japanese football managers
Japan national football team managers
Association football midfielders